In mathematical analysis, Korn's inequality is an inequality concerning the gradient of a vector field that generalizes the following classical theorem: if the gradient of a vector field is skew-symmetric at every point, then the gradient must be equal to a constant skew-symmetric matrix.  Korn's theorem is a quantitative version of this statement, which intuitively says that if the gradient of a vector field is on average not far from the space of skew-symmetric matrices, then the gradient must not be far from a particular skew-symmetric matrix.  The statement that Korn's inequality generalizes thus arises as a special case of rigidity.

In (linear) elasticity theory, the symmetric part of the gradient is a measure of the strain that an elastic body experiences when it is deformed by a given vector-valued function.  The inequality is therefore an important tool as an a priori estimate in linear elasticity theory.

Statement of the inequality

Let  be an open, connected domain in -dimensional Euclidean space , . Let  be the Sobolev space of all vector fields  on  that, along with their (first) weak derivatives, lie in the Lebesgue space .

where  denotes the symmetrized gradient given by

Inequality  is known as Korn's inequality.

See also

Linear elasticity
Hardy inequality
Poincaré inequality

References

.
 .
.
.

External links

Inequalities
Sobolev spaces
Solid mechanics